Port Neville is a bay, port and locality on the north side of Johnstone Strait, south of Call Inlet, in the Central Coast region of British Columbia, Canada.

Port Neville Indian Reserve No. 4, or Port Neville 4, is located at the upper end of the port, to the south of Fulmore Lake at   It is 14.9 ha. in size and is under the governance of the Tlowitsis Tribe band government of the Kwakwaka'wakw peoples.

Its name means "fort on flat on beach".

This "very snug and commodious port" was named by Captain Vancouver probably in honour of Lieutenant John Neville of the Royal Marines but there is doubt about who he referred to.

See also
List of settlements in British Columbia

References

Ports and harbours of British Columbia
Unincorporated settlements in British Columbia
Central Coast of British Columbia
Kwakwaka'wakw